Area code 878 is an overlay area code in Southwestern Pennsylvania, centered in Pittsburgh. It simultaneously overlays the region's two existing area codes, 412 and 724, making ten-digit dialing mandatory in the Pittsburgh area.

412 had served southwestern Pennsylvania for 41 years before 724 was created for most of the old 412 territory outside of Pittsburgh in 1998.  Bell Atlantic (now part of Verizon), the main telephone provider in the area, wanted to implement 724 as an overlay to spare residents and businesses the burden of changing their numbers.  However, overlays were still a new concept at the time, and met with considerable resistance due to the need for ten-digit dialing.  Thus, the proposal was changed to a geographic split.  Within two years, however, both 412 and 724 were on the verge of exhaustion.  Overlays had gained more acceptance by then, so 878 was implemented as an overlay. It came into effect on August 17, 2001.

Although ten-digit dialing has been mandatory in southwestern Pennsylvania since 2001, no 878 numbers were assigned for more than a decade due to number-conservation procedures implemented in both Pittsburgh itself and the suburbs. On February 15, 2013, the Pennsylvania Public Utility Commission announced it would start to issue 878 numbers in the 724 territory sometime within the next year, as 724 was nearly exhausted. The first 878 numbers were assigned in April 2013, nearly 12 years after the overlay was activated.

On September 15, 2015, the first prefix (999) was assigned into the 412 territory.

As of February 2020, Verizon is issuing 878 telephone numbers inside 412's original territory.

References

See also

878
878